Breviceps acutirostris, also known as common rain frog, strawberry rain frog, or Cape short-headed frog, is a species of frog in the family Brevicipitidae. It is endemic to the southwestern Cape region in South Africa. Development is direct (i.e., there is no free-living larval stage).
It is threatened by habitat loss, although much of its habitat is also protected.

References

Breviceps
Frogs of Africa
Endemic amphibians of South Africa
Amphibians described in 1963
Taxonomy articles created by Polbot